"Chattanooga City Limit Sign" is a song written by Bob Drawdy and originally recorded by Johnny Cash for his Billy Sherrill–produced 1981 album The Baron.

In December 1981 or January 1982, the song had a single release as the flip side to "The Reverend Mr. Black". U.S. Billboard country chart listed the single as a double-sided hit.

Track listing

Charts 
 As a double A-side with "The Reverend Mr. Black"

References

External links 
 "Chattanooga City Limit Sign" on the Johnny Cash official website

Johnny Cash songs
1981 songs
1981 singles
Songs written by Curly Putman
Song recordings produced by Billy Sherrill
Columbia Records singles